Dejan Babić (born 20 April 1989) is a Serbian football midfielder who plays for Prva iskra Barič.

Career
On 26 July 2015 signed to Maccabi Yavne.

References

External links
 
 Dejan Babić at Utakmica.rs

1989 births
Footballers from Belgrade
Living people
Serbian footballers
Association football midfielders
FK Radnički Beograd players
FK BSK Borča players
FK Partizan players
FK Sloboda Užice players
FK Rad players
FK Borac Čačak players
Maccabi Yavne F.C. players
FK Bežanija players
FK Novi Pazar players
NK Vitez players
FK Mačva Šabac players
OFK Žarkovo players
Serbian SuperLiga players
Liga Leumit players
Serbian First League players
Premier League of Bosnia and Herzegovina players
Serbian expatriate footballers
Expatriate footballers in Israel
Serbian expatriate sportspeople in Israel
Expatriate footballers in Bosnia and Herzegovina
Serbian expatriate sportspeople in Bosnia and Herzegovina